Edwin E. Lewis (1846–1928) was an American architect from Gardiner, Maine.

Life and career
Lewis was born in Cornish, New Hampshire in 1846.  His family later moved to Croydon, and then Claremont.  In February 1865, at the age of 19, he enlisted in the Union Army. He returned to Claremont later that year, where he became a carpenter.  He married in 1866.  He and his wife later went to Keene, and moved to Gardiner in 1875.  There he practiced as a contractor, and became known for the designs he built.  In 1883 he received his first architectural commission, a building in Richmond.  The following year he opened an architectural office in Gardiner.

Lewis practiced until November 1897, when he was appointed Chief Engineer and General Superintendent of Construction at Togus, probably due to the extensive work he had done there while in private practice.  He retired from that position in 1917, and died in 1928.

Works
 1884 - Gardiner Coliseum, Maine Ave, Gardiner, Maine Demolished.
 1885 - William Kane House, 18 Vine St, Gardiner, Maine
 1887 - Crosby Inn, Main & Franklin Sts, Belfast, Maine Burned in 1896.
 1887 - Masonic Block, 153 Main St, Farmington, Maine
 1889 - Calais National Bank Building, 345 Main St, Calais, Maine
 1889 - Central Street Intermediate School, 8 Cherry St, Gardiner, Maine
 1889 - Gardiner Congregational Church, 15 Brunswick Ave, Gardiner, Maine Burned in 1915.
 1889 - Skowhegan Free Public Library, 9 Elm St, Skowhegan, Maine
 1890 - Charles E. Littlefield House, 96 Limerock St, Rockland, Maine
 1890 - Masonic Building, 16 Common St, Waterville, Maine
 1890 - William M. Shaw House, 40 Norris St, Greenville, Maine
 1890 - Union Hall, 18 Central St, Danforth, Maine
 1891 - Gardiner Savings Institution Building, 190 Water St, Gardiner, Maine Demolished in 1954.
 1891 - Opera House Block, Main & Lincoln Sts, Dover-Foxcroft, Maine Demolished.
 1892 - Madison Congregational Church, 124 Main St, Madison, Maine
 1892 - Shaw Block, 20 Congress St, Rumford, Maine  Demolished.
 1892 - Winthrop Congregational Church, 10 Bosdoin St, Winthrop, Maine
 1894 - First Baptist Church, 46 Court St, Houlton, Maine
 1894 - Opera House Block, 414 Main St, Norway, Maine
 1896 - Patten Block, 185 Water St, Gardiner, Maine
 1896 - Plummer Street Intermediate School, 12 Plummer St, Gardiner, Maine
 1897 - Masonic Block, 169 Water St, Gardiner, Maine  Demolished.
 1897 - Myrtle Street School, Myrtle St, Waterville, Maine Burned in 1981.

References

1846 births
1928 deaths
Architects from Maine
19th-century American architects
People from Cornish, New Hampshire
People from Gardiner, Maine
People from Claremont, New Hampshire